The Barwick Baronetcy, of Ashbrooke Grange, in the Borough of Sunderland, in the County of County Durham, was a title in the Baronetage of the United Kingdom. It was created on 1 February 1912 for the coalfitter and shipowner John Storey Barwick. It became extinct upon the death of his grandson, the third baronet, in 1979, who had a stepson Robert Barwick Ward, but no direct heir.

Barwick baronets (1912–1979)
Sir John Storey Barwick, 1st Baronet (1840–1915)
Sir John Storey Barwick, 2nd Baronet (1876–1953)
Sir Richard Llewellyn Barwick, 3rd Baronet (1916–1979)

References

Extinct baronetcies in the Baronetage of the United Kingdom